Avondale Plantation Home is a historic plantation house located along Andrews Road, about  southeast of Louisiana Highway 10, and about  east of Clinton, Louisiana.  It was built in 1825 and was added to the National Register of Historic Places on December 17, 1982.

It is a one-and-a-half-story Greek Revival-style house which was, in 1982, located on an open hilltop near the town of Clinton.  In 1980 it was moved  to its actual location, from the Avon Plantation site which had long earlier become a Boy Scout summer camp named Camp Avondale.

See also
National Register of Historic Places listings in East Feliciana Parish, Louisiana

References

Houses on the National Register of Historic Places in Louisiana
Plantation houses in Louisiana
Houses completed in 1825
Houses in East Feliciana Parish, Louisiana
Relocated buildings and structures in Louisiana
National Register of Historic Places in East Feliciana Parish, Louisiana